WJBD-FM is a radio station broadcasting on the frequency of 100.1 MHz and licensed to the city of Salem, Illinois. The format is Full-service radio and is known as Full Service 100.1 WJBD.

WJBD-FM is owned and operated by NRG Media, through licensee NRG License Sub, LLC. The station is affiliated with Westwood One Sports.

References

External links
WJBD Facebook

JBD-FM
Radio stations established in 1972
1972 establishments in Illinois
Full service radio stations in the United States
NRG Media radio stations
Marion County, Illinois